Joseph Mendelssohn (11 August 1770 – 24 November 1848) was a German Jewish banker.

He was the oldest son of the influential philosopher Moses Mendelssohn. In 1795, he founded his own banking house. In 1804, his younger brother, Abraham Mendelssohn Bartholdy, the father of the composers Fanny and Felix Mendelssohn, joined the company. The bank Mendelssohn & Co. continued under the control of the Mendelssohn family and would rise to prominence during the 19th century, becoming one of the most important and influential German banks during the early 20th century.

Descendants

Joseph's descendants include the neurologist Alexander Carl Otto Westphal (1863–1941) and the musician Ben Parry (musician) (b.1965).

See also 
List of people from Berlin

External links
Sebastian Panwitz: Joseph Mendelssohn; in Mendelssohn-Enzyklopädie.

1770 births
1848 deaths
Burials at Schönhauser Allee Cemetery, Berlin
German bankers
German company founders
18th-century German Jews
Joseph
Businesspeople from Berlin
People from Mitte